There are about 1,400 known moth species of Cameroon. The moths (mostly nocturnal) and butterflies (mostly diurnal) together make up the taxonomic order Lepidoptera.

This is a list of moth species which have been recorded in Cameroon.

Alucitidae
Alucita illuminatrix (Meyrick, 1929)
Alucita megaphimus (Hering, 1917)

Anomoeotidae
Anomoeotes instabilis Talbot, 1929
Anomoeotes leucolena Holland, 1893
Anomoeotes phaeomera Hampson, 1920
Anomoeotes tenellula Holland, 1893
Staphylinochrous euryperalis Hampson, 1910
Staphylinochrous euryphaea Hampson, 1920
Staphylinochrous ruficilia Hampson, 1920

Arctiidae
Acantharctia nivea Aurivillius, 1900
Afraloa bifurca (Walker, 1855)
Afrasura discocellularis (Strand, 1912)
Afrasura hieroglyphica (Bethune-Baker, 1911)
Afrasura numida (Holland, 1893)
Afrasura obliterata (Walker, 1864)
Afrasura peripherica (Strand, 1912)
Afroarctia bergeri Toulgoët, 1978
Afroarctia dargei (Toulgoët, 1976)
Afroarctia kenyana (Rothschild, 1933)
Afroarctia mamfei Toulgoët, 1978
Afroarctia nebulosa Toulgoët, 1980
Afroarctia sjostedti (Aurivillius, 1900)
Agylloides problematica Strand, 1912
Aloa moloneyi (Druce, 1887)
Alpenus maculosa (Stoll, 1781)
Alpenus schraderi (Rothschild, 1910)
Alpenus thomasi Watson, 1988
Amata alenicola (Strand, 1912)
Amata alicia (Butler, 1876)
Amata benitonis Strand, 1912
Amata borguensis (Hampson, 1901)
Amata flavoanalis (Seitz, 1926)
Amata leucerythra (Holland, 1893)
Amata marina (Butler, 1876)
Amata ploetzi (Strand, 1912)
Amata tomasina (Butler, 1876)
Amata uelleburgensis (Strand, 1912)
Amata waldowi (Grünberg, 1907)
Amerila atrivena (Hampson, 1907)
Amerila brunnea (Hampson, 1901)
Amerila femina (Berio, 1935)
Amerila fennia (Druce, 1887)
Amerila luteibarba (Hampson, 1901)
Amerila nigroapicalis (Aurivillius, 1900)
Amerila niveivitrea (Bartel, 1903)
Amphicallia pactolicus (Butler, 1888)
Amsacta bicoloria (Gaede, 1916)
Amsacta flavicostata (Gaede, 1916)
Anapisa cleta (Plötz, 1880)
Anapisa crenophylax (Holland, 1893)
Anapisa melaleuca (Holland, 1898)
Anapisa monotica (Holland, 1893)
Anapisa sjoestedti (Aurivillius, 1904)
Archithosia costimacula (Mabille, 1878)
Archithosia duplicata Birket-Smith, 1965
Archithosia makomensis (Strand, 1912)
Archithosia similis Birket-Smith, 1965
Archithosia sordida Birket-Smith, 1965
Argina amanda (Boisduval, 1847)
Asura camerunensis Strand, 1912
Asura craigii (Holland, 1893)
Asura pectinella Strand, 1922
Asythosia velutina Birket-Smith, 1965
Balacra batesi Druce, 1910
Balacra brunnea Grünberg, 1907
Balacra caeruleifascia Walker, 1856
Balacra daphaena (Hampson, 1898)
Balacra elegans Aurivillius, 1892
Balacra flavimacula Walker, 1856
Balacra haemalea Holland, 1893
Balacra herona (Druce, 1887)
Balacra jaensis Bethune-Baker, 1927
Balacra nigripennis (Aurivillius, 1904)
Balacra preussi (Aurivillius, 1904)
Balacra pulchra Aurivillius, 1892
Balacra rubricincta Holland, 1893
Balacra rubrostriata (Aurivillius, 1892)
Bergeria haematochrysa Kiriakoff, 1952
Binna scita (Walker, 1865)
Cameroonia nigriceps (Aurivillius, 1904)
Caryatis hersilia Druce, 1887
Caryatis phileta (Drury, 1782)
Caryatis syntomina Butler, 1878
Ceryx alenina Strand, 1912
Ceryx barombina Gaede, 1926
Ceryx elasson (Holland, 1893)
Ceryx hilda (Ehrmann, 1894)
Ceryx infranigra (Strand, 1912)
Cyana flammeostrigata Karisch, 2003
Cyana loloana (Strand, 1912)
Cyana rubriterminalis (Strand, 1912)
Cyana rufeola Karisch & Dall'Asta, 2010
Cyana trigutta (Walker, 1854)
Disparctia vittata (Druce, 1898)
Dubatolovia neurophaea (Hampson, 1911)
Eilema angustipennis Strand, 1912
Eilema bueana Strand, 1912
Eilema goniophoroides Strand, 1912
Eilema mesosticta Hampson, 1911
Eilema pulverosa Aurivillius, 1904
Epilacydes scita (Walker, 1865)
Epilacydes simulans Butler, 1875
Epitoxis myopsychoides Strand, 1912
Euchromia guineensis (Fabricius, 1775)
Euchromia lethe (Fabricius, 1775)
Galtara aurivilii (Pagenstecher, 1901)
Hippurarctia cinereoguttata (Strand, 1912)
Hippurarctia ferrigera (Druce, 1910)
Logunovium nigricosta (Holland, 1893)
Logunovium scortillum Wallengren, 1875
Mecistorhabdia haematoessa (Holland, 1893)
Meganaclia perpusilla (Walker, 1856)
Meganaclia sippia (Plötz, 1880)
Melisa diptera (Walker, 1854)
Melisoides lobata Strand, 1912
Metarctia benitensis Holland, 1893
Metarctia forsteri Kiriakoff, 1955
Metarctia inconspicua Holland, 1892
Metarctia lateritia Herrich-Schäffer, 1855
Metarctia pamela Kiriakoff, 1957
Metarctia rubripuncta Hampson, 1898
Micralarctia punctulatum (Wallengren, 1860)
Microbergeria luctuosa Kiriakoff, 1972
Muxta xanthopa (Holland, 1893)
Myopsyche fulvibasalis (Hampson, 1918)
Myopsyche idda (Plötz, 1880)
Myopsyche miserabilis (Holland, 1893)
Myopsyche nervalis Strand, 1912
Myopsyche ochsenheimeri (Boisduval, 1829)
Myopsyche victorina (Plötz, 1880)
Myopsyche xanthopleura (Holland, 1898)
Nacliodes microsippia Strand, 1912
Nanna ceratopygia Birket-Smith, 1965
Nanna diplisticta (Bethune-Baker, 1911)
Nanna eningae (Plötz, 1880)
Nanna kamerunica Kühne, 2007
Nanna loloana (Strand, 1912)
Nanna magna Birket-Smith, 1965
Neophemula vitrina (Oberthür, 1909)
Neuroxena aberrans Bethune-Baker, 1927
Neuroxena albofasciata (Druce, 1910)
Neuroxena fulleri (Druce, 1883)
Neuroxena obscurascens (Strand, 1909)
Nyctemera acraeina Druce, 1882
Nyctemera apicalis (Walker, 1854)
Nyctemera arieticornis (Strand, 1909)
Nyctemera chromis Druce, 1882
Nyctemera druna (Swinhoe, 1904)
Nyctemera hemixantha (Aurivillius, 1904)
Nyctemera itokina (Aurivillius, 1904)
Nyctemera perspicua (Walker, 1854)
Nyctemera rattrayi (Swinhoe, 1904)
Nyctemera xanthura (Plötz, 1880)
Paralpenus flavicosta (Hampson, 1909)
Paramelisa lophuroides Oberthür, 1911
Pericaliella melanodisca (Hampson, 1907)
Phryganopsis angulifascia (Strand, 1912)
Pliniola nigristriata (Holland, 1893)
Poliosia nigrifrons Hampson, 1900
Pseudothyretes rubicundula (Strand, 1912)
Pusiola celida (Bethune-Baker, 1911)
Pusiola monotonia (Strand, 1912)
Pusiola occidentalis (Strand, 1912)
Pusiola squamosa (Bethune-Baker, 1911)
Radiarctia lutescens (Walker, 1854)
Rhabdomarctia rubrilineata (Bethune-Baker, 1911)
Rhipidarctia conradti (Oberthür, 1911)
Rhipidarctia flaviceps (Hampson, 1898)
Rhipidarctia invaria (Walker, 1856)
Rhipidarctia miniata Kiriakoff, 1957
Rhipidarctia rubrovitta (Aurivillius, 1904)
Spilosoma aurantiaca (Holland, 1893)
Spilosoma batesi (Rothschild, 1910)
Spilosoma immaculata Bartel, 1903
Spilosoma rava (Druce, 1898)
Spilosoma sulphurea Bartel, 1903
Spilosoma togoensis Bartel, 1903
Stenarctia abdominalis Rothschild, 1910
Stenarctia quadripunctata Aurivillius, 1900
Tesma fractifascia (Hampson, 1918)
Tesma nigrapex (Strand, 1912)
Thyrogonia efulensis (Holland, 1898)
Trichaeta schultzei Aurivillius, 1905
Zobida trinitas (Strand, 1912)

Bombycidae
Amusaron kolga (Druce, 1887)
Amusaron pruinosa (Grünberg, 1907)
Vingerhoedtia grisea (Gaede, 1927)

Brahmaeidae
Dactyloceras bramarbas (Karsch, 1895)
Dactyloceras karinae Bouyer, 2002
Dactyloceras nebulosum Brosch, Naumann & Meister, 2002
Dactyloceras ostentator Hering, 1927

Copromorphidae
Rhynchoferella simplex Strand, 1915

Cosmopterigidae
Allotalanta ochthotoma Meyrick, 1930
Allotalanta tephroclystis Meyrick, 1930
Cosmopterix athesiae Huemer & Koster, 2006
Macrobathra neurocoma Meyrick, 1930

Cossidae
Phragmataecia pelostema (Hering, 1923)
Xyleutes crassus Drury, ????

Crambidae
Aethaloessa floridalis (Zeller, 1852)
Agathodes bibundalis Strand, 1913
Argyractis tripunctalis (Snellen, 1872)
Bocchoris inspersalis (Zeller, 1852)
Bradina longipennis (Hampson, 1912)
Bradina sordidalis (Dewitz, 1881)
Cadarena sinuata (Fabricius, 1781)
Cangetta primulina (Hampson, 1916)
Cirrhochrista poecilocygnalis Strand, 1915
Cirrhochrista quinquemaculalis Strand, 1915
Cirrhochrista saltusalis Schaus, 1893
Cnaphalocrocis poeyalis (Boisduval, 1833)
Cotachena smaragdina (Butler, 1875)
Diaphana indica (Saunders, 1851)
Diasemiopsis ramburialis (Duponchel, 1834)
Epipagis cancellalis (Zeller, 1852)
Eporidia dariusalis Walker, 1859
Eurrhyparodes bracteolalis (Zeller, 1852)
Eurrhyparodes tricoloralis (Zeller, 1852)
Filodes normalis Hampson, 1912
Glyphodes stolalis Guenée, 1854
Maruca vitrata (Fabricius, 1787)
Noctuelita bicolorata Strand, 1915
Omiodes indicata (Fabricius, 1775)
Orphanostigma excisa (Martin, 1956)
Palpita bonjongalis (Plötz, 1880)
Parotis baldersalis (Walker, 1859)
Phostria biguttata (Hampson, 1898)
Phostria hesusalis (Walker, 1859)
Phryganodes biguttata Hampson, 1898
Pleuroptya balteata (Fabricius, 1798)
Psara bipunctalis (Fabricius, 1794)
Pseudonoorda distigmalis (Hampson, 1913)
Pycnarmon diaphana (Cramer, 1779)
Pyrausta marginepunctalis Gaede, 1916
Pyrausta simialis (Gaede, 1916)
Spoladea recurvalis (Fabricius, 1775)
Stemorrhages sericea (Drury, 1773)
Syllepte butlerii (Dewitz, 1881)
Syllepte patagialis (Zeller, 1852)
Udeoides bonakandaiensis Maes, 2006
Ulopeza panaresalis (Walker, 1859)
Viettessa bethalis (Viette, 1958)
Zebronia phenice (Cramer, 1780)

Drepanidae
Callidrepana argyrobapta (Gaede, 1914)
Callidrepana serena Watson, 1965
Epicampoptera efulena Watson, 1965
Epicampoptera heringi Gaede, 1927
Epicampoptera lumaria Watson, 1965
Epicampoptera marantica (Tams, 1930)
Epicampoptera strandi Bryk, 1913
Epicampoptera tumidula Watson, 1965
Gonoreta contracta (Warren, 1897)
Gonoreta differenciata (Bryk, 1913)
Gonoreta gonioptera (Hampson, 1914)
Gonoreta subtilis (Bryk, 1913)
Isospidia angustipennis (Warren, 1904)
Isospidia brunneola (Holland, 1893)
Negera bimaculata (Holland, 1893)
Negera clenchi Watson, 1965
Negera confusa Walker, 1855
Negera natalensis (Felder, 1874)
Spidia excentrica Strand, 1912
Spidia fenestrata Butler, 1878
Spidia inangulata Watson, 1965
Spidia rufinota Watson, 1965
Spidia subviridis (Warren, 1899)
Uranometra oculata (Holland, 1893)

Elachistidae
Cryptolechia bibundella (Strand, 1913)
Elachista cordata Sruoga & J. de Prins, 2011
Urodeta absidata Sruoga & J. de Prins, 2011
Urodeta aculeata Sruoga & J. de Prins, 2011
Urodeta crenata Sruoga & J. de Prins, 2011
Urodeta cuspidis Sruoga & J. de Prins, 2011
Urodeta faro Sruoga & J. de Prins, 2011
Urodeta tortuosa Sruoga & J. de Prins, 2011

Eriocottidae
Compsoctena rustica (Strand, 1914)

Eupterotidae
Acrojana sciron (Druce, 1887)
Acrojana scutaea Strand, 1909
Camerunia orphne (Schaus, 1893)
Epijana cosima (Plötz, 1880)
Hoplojana rhodoptera (Gerstaecker, 1871)
Jana eurymas Herrich-Schäffer, 1854
Jana gracilis Walker, 1855
Jana preciosa Aurivillius, 1893
Jana strigina Westwood, 1849
Janomima dannfelti (Aurivillius, 1893)
Parajana gabunica (Aurivillius, 1892)
Phiala albida Plötz, 1880
Phiala cunina Cramer, 1780
Phiala pseudatomaria Strand, 1911
Phiala specialis Kühne, 2007
Stenoglene citrinus (Druce, 1886)
Stenoglene dehanicus (Strand, 1911)
Stenoglene opalina Druce, 1910
Stenoglene pellucida Joicey & Talbot, 1924
Stenoglene preussi (Aurivillius, 1893)
Stenoglene thelda (Druce, 1887)

Gelechiidae
Prasodryas acratopa Meyrick
Ptilothyris climacista Meyrick, 1926

Geometridae
Acrostatheusis sanaga Herbulot, 1991
Agathia multiscripta Warren, 1898
Aletis helcita (Linnaeus, 1763)
Antharmostes dargei Herbulot, 1982
Antharmostes reducta Herbulot, 1996
Antharmostes sufflata Herbulot, 1982
Archichlora epicydra Prout, 1938
Archichlora jacksoni Carcasson, 1971
Asthenotricha amblycoma Prout, 1935
Asthenotricha pycnoconia Janse, 1933
Asthenotricha semidivisa Warren, 1901
Bathycolpodes bassa Herbulot, 1986
Bathycolpodes holochroa Prout, 1915
Bathycolpodes melanceuthes Prout, 1922
Bathycolpodes pectinata Herbulot, 1992
Bathycolpodes torniflorata Prout, 1917
Biston abruptaria (Walker, 1869)
Biston antecreta (Prout, 1938)
Biston dargei (Herbulot, 1973)
Biston johannaria (Oberthür, 1913)
Biston subocularia (Mabille, 1893)
Cartaletis forbesi (Druce, 1884)
Cartaletis gracilis (Möschler, 1887)
Cartaletis sapor (Druce, 1910)
Chiasmia albivia (Prout, 1915)
Chiasmia collaxata (Herbulot, 1987)
Chiasmia normata (Walker, 1861)
Chiasmia percnoptera (Prout, 1915)
Chiasmia sororcula (Warren, 1897)
Chiasmia umbrata (Warren, 1897)
Chlorodrepana aequisecta Prout, 1922
Chrysocraspeda heringi Prout, 1932
Cleora acaciaria (Boisduval, 1833)
Cleora pavlitzkiae (D. S. Fletcher, 1958)
Cleora rostella D. S. Fletcher, 1967
Cleora rothkirchi (Strand, 1914)
Cleora tulbaghata (Felder & Rogenhofer, 1875)
Collix foraminata Guenée, 1858
Colocleora derennei Herbulot, 1975
Colocleora linearis Herbulot, 1985
Colocleora potaenia (Prout, 1915)
Colocleora sanghana Herbulot, 1985
Colocleora smithi (Warren, 1904)
Comibaena barnsi Prout, 1930
Comostolopsis rubristicta (Warren, 1899)
Comostolopsis stillata (Felder & Rogenhofer, 1875)
Conolophia persimilis (Warren, 1905)
Cyclophora diplosticta (Prout, 1918)
Derambila punctisignata Walker, 1863
Derambila thearia (Swinhoe, 1904)
Dioptrochasma aino Bryk, 1913
Dioptrochasma homochroa (Holland, 1893)
Dithecodes ornithospila (Prout, 1911)
Dualana veniliformis Strand, 1914
Dysnymphus monostigma Prout, 1915
Ecpetala camerunica Herbulot, 1988
Ecpetala carnifasciata (Warren, 1899)
Epigynopteryx flavedinaria (Guenée, 1857)
Epigynopteryx flexa Prout, 1931
Epigynopteryx molochina Herbulot, 1984
Epigynopteryx tabitha Warren, 1901
Episteira atrospila (Strand, 1915)
Erastria albosignata (Walker, 1863)
Ereunetea minor (Holland, 1893)
Ereunetea translucens Prout, 1934
Eupithecia candicans Herbulot, 1988
Eupithecia celatisigna (Warren, 1902)
Eupithecia devestita (Warren, 1899)
Eupithecia dilucida (Warren, 1899)
Eupithecia dohertyi Prout, 1935
Eupithecia multispinata D. S. Fletcher, 1951
Eupithecia nigribasis (Warren, 1902)
Eupithecia steeleae D. S. Fletcher, 1951
Gelasmodes fasciata (Warren, 1899)
Geodena barombica Strand, 1911
Geodena hintzi Strand, 1915
Geolyces attesaria Walker, 1860
Geolyces tanytmesis Prout, 1934
Gymnoscelis bassa Herbulot, 1981
Hispophora amica (Prout, 1915)
Horisme pallidimacula Prout, 1925
Hyalornis livida Herbulot, 1973
Hylemeridia eurema (Plötz, 1880)
Hypochrosis banakaria (Plötz, 1880)
Hypochrosis euphyes Prout, 1915
Hypocoela turpisaria (Swinhoe, 1904)
Hypomecis nessa Herbulot, 1995
Hypomecis quaerenda Herbulot, 2000
Idiodes flexilinea (Warren, 1898)
Idiodes pectinata (Herbulot, 1966)
Klinzigidia dithecodes Herbulot, 1982
Lophorrhachia mutanda Herbulot, 1983
Macropitthea massagaria (Karsch, 1895)
Megadrepana cinerea Holland, 1893
Melinoessa amplissimata (Walker, 1863)
Melinoessa asteria Prout, 1934
Melinoessa croesaria Herrich-Schäffer, 1855
Melinoessa eurycrossa Prout, 1934
Melinoessa horni Prout, 1922
Melinoessa midas Prout, 1922
Menophra bilobata Herbulot, 1995
Menophra dnophera (Prout, 1915)
Metallochlora camerunica Herbulot, 1982
Metallochlora melanopis Prout, 1915
Miantochora picturata Herbulot, 1985
Microlyces bassa Herbulot, 1981
Mimaletis landbecki (Druce, 1910)
Narthecusa tenuiorata Walker, 1862
Nothylemera neaera (Druce, 1887)
Omphalucha brunnea (Warren, 1899)
Oxyfidonia monoderctes Prout, 1915
Phaiogramma faustinata (Millière, 1868)
Piercia ansorgei (Bethune-Baker, 1913)
Piercia myopteryx Prout, 1935
Pigiopsis hyposcotia Prout, 1915
Pigiopsis scotoides Prout, 1915
Pingasa distensaria (Walker, 1860)
Pingasa nigrolineata Karisch, 2006
Pitthea continua Walker, 1854
Pitthea eximia Druce, 1910
Pitthea famula Drury, 1773
Pitthea flavimargo Druce, 1910
Pitthea mungi Plötz, 1880
Prasinocyma bamenda Herbulot, 1982
Prasinocyma gemmatimargo Prout, 1915
Prasinocyma nigripunctata (Warren, 1897)
Prasinocyma permagna Herbulot, 1982
Prasinocyma rugistrigula Prout, 1912
Prasinocyma trifilifimbria Prout, 1915
Protosteira spectabilis (Warren, 1899)
Pseudhemithea exomila Prout, 1917
Pseudolarentia megalaria (Guenée, 1858)
Psilocerea pulverosa (Warren, 1894)
Psilocladia repudiosa (Prout, 1915)
Racotis angulosa Herbulot, 1973
Racotis zebrina Warren, 1899
Scopula anoista (Prout, 1915)
Scopula batesi Prout, 1932
Scopula fuscobrunnea (Warren, 1901)
Scopula jejuna Prout, 1932
Scopula laevipennis (Warren, 1897)
Scopula macrocelis (Prout, 1915)
Scopula obliquifascia Herbulot, 1999
Scopula rectisecta Prout, 1920
Scopula recurvata Herbulot, 1992
Scopula subperlaria (Warren, 1897)
Scopula toxophora Prout, 1919
Somatina syneorus Prout, 1915
Terina charmione (Fabricius, 1793)
Terina circumdata Walker, 1865
Terina doleris (Plötz, 1880)
Terina ochricosta Rebel, 1914
Terina octogesa (Druce, 1887)
Traminda drepanodes Prout, 1915
Trimetopia aetheraria Guenée, 1858
Unnamed genus Ennominae cyrtogramma (Prout, 1915)
Victoria taminata Herbulot, 1982
Xanthisthisa extrema Herbulot, 1999
Xanthisthisa tarsispina (Warren, 1901)
Xanthorhoe ansorgei (Warren, 1899)
Xanthorhoe exorista Prout, 1922
Xanthorhoe heliopharia (Swinhoe, 1904)
Xanthorhoe pseudognathos Herbulot, 1981
Xanthorhoe tamsi D. S. Fletcher, 1963
Xanthorhoe transjugata Prout, 1923
Xanthorhoe trientata (Warren, 1901)
Xenimpia chalepa Prout, 1915
Xenochroma angulosa Herbulot, 1984
Xylopteryx amieti Herbulot, 1973
Xylopteryx dargei Herbulot, 1984
Xylopteryx elongata Herbulot, 1984
Xylopteryx lemairei Herbulot, 1984
Zamarada aclys D. S. Fletcher, 1974
Zamarada acrochra Prout, 1928
Zamarada adumbrata D. S. Fletcher, 1974
Zamarada aerata D. S. Fletcher, 1974
Zamarada aglae Oberthür, 1912
Zamarada antimima D. S. Fletcher, 1974
Zamarada apicata Herbulot, 1983
Zamarada ariste D. S. Fletcher, 1974
Zamarada astales D. S. Fletcher, 1974
Zamarada auratisquama Warren, 1897
Zamarada aurolineata Gaede, 1915
Zamarada azona Herbulot, 1983
Zamarada bastelbergeri Gaede, 1915
Zamarada bernardii D. S. Fletcher, 1974
Zamarada bicuspida D. S. Fletcher, 1974
Zamarada bonaberiensis Strand, 1915
Zamarada cathetus D. S. Fletcher, 1974
Zamarada catori Bethune-Baker, 1913
Zamarada clavigera D. S. Fletcher, 1974
Zamarada clementi Herbulot, 1975
Zamarada clenchi D. S. Fletcher, 1974
Zamarada clio Oberthür, 1912
Zamarada consummata D. S. Fletcher, 1974
Zamarada corroborata Herbulot, 1954
Zamarada corymbophora D. S. Fletcher, 1974
Zamarada crenulata D. S. Fletcher, 1974
Zamarada crystallophana Mabille, 1900
Zamarada cucharita D. S. Fletcher, 1974
Zamarada cydippe Herbulot, 1954
Zamarada dentigera Warren, 1909
Zamarada dialitha D. S. Fletcher, 1974
Zamarada dilata D. S. Fletcher, 1974
Zamarada dilucida Warren, 1909
Zamarada dolorosa D. S. Fletcher, 1974
Zamarada dyscapna D. S. Fletcher, 1974
Zamarada emaciata D. S. Fletcher, 1974
Zamarada episema D. S. Fletcher, 1974
Zamarada erato Oberthür, 1912
Zamarada erosa D. S. Fletcher, 1974
Zamarada eryma D. S. Fletcher, 1974
Zamarada euerces Prout, 1928
Zamarada euphrosyne Oberthür, 1912
Zamarada excavata Bethune-Baker, 1913
Zamarada ferruginata D. S. Fletcher, 1974
Zamarada flavicosta Warren, 1897
Zamarada fumosa Gaede, 1915
Zamarada fusticula D. S. Fletcher, 1974
Zamarada gaedei D. S. Fletcher, 1974
Zamarada griseola D. S. Fletcher, 1974
Zamarada herbuloti D. S. Fletcher, 1974
Zamarada hero D. S. Fletcher, 1974
Zamarada ignicosta Prout, 1912
Zamarada ilaria Swinhoe, 1904
Zamarada incompta D. S. Fletcher, 1974
Zamarada ixiaria Swinhoe, 1904
Zamarada kala Herbulot, 1975
Zamarada labifera Prout, 1915
Zamarada latimargo Warren, 1897
Zamarada lepta D. S. Fletcher, 1974
Zamarada melanopyga Herbulot, 1954
Zamarada melpomene Oberthür, 1912
Zamarada mimesis D. S. Fletcher, 1974
Zamarada montana Herbulot, 1979
Zamarada nasuta Warren, 1897
Zamarada nigrapex Herbulot, 1981
Zamarada odontis Pierre-Baltus, 2000
Zamarada opala Carcasson, 1964
Zamarada ostracodes D. S. Fletcher, 1974
Zamarada paxilla D. S. Fletcher, 1974
Zamarada pelobasis D. S. Fletcher, 1974
Zamarada phrontisaria Swinhoe, 1904
Zamarada platycephala D. S. Fletcher, 1974
Zamarada polyctemon Prout, 1932
Zamarada pristis D. S. Fletcher, 1974
Zamarada protrusa Warren, 1897
Zamarada reflexaria (Walker, 1863)
Zamarada rupta D. S. Fletcher, 1974
Zamarada sagitta D. S. Fletcher, 1974
Zamarada schalida D. S. Fletcher, 1974
Zamarada sicula D. S. Fletcher, 1974
Zamarada similis D. S. Fletcher, 1974
Zamarada subincolaris Gaede, 1915
Zamarada suda D. S. Fletcher, 1974
Zamarada terpsichore Oberthür, 1912
Zamarada thalia Oberthür, 1912
Zamarada tortura D. S. Fletcher, 1974
Zamarada triangularis Gaede, 1915
Zamarada tricuspida D. S. Fletcher, 1974
Zamarada tullia Oberthür, 1913
Zamarada undimarginata Warren, 1897
Zamarada urania Oberthür, 1912
Zamarada variola D. S. Fletcher, 1974
Zamarada vigilans Prout, 1915
Zamarada volsella D. S. Fletcher, 1974
Zamarada vulpina Warren, 1897
Zamarada weberi D. S. Fletcher, 1974
Zamarada xystra D. S. Fletcher, 1974

Gracillariidae
Acrocercops bifasciata (Walsingham, 1891)
Cameraria fara de Prins, 2012
Phyllonorycter farensis De Prins & De Prins, 2007
Phyllonorycter gozmanyi De Prins & De Prins, 2007
Phyllonorycter hibiscina (Vári, 1961)
Porphyrosela desmodivora de Prins, 2012

Himantopteridae
Doratopteryx camerunica Hering, 1937

Himantopteridae
Pedoptila thaletes Druce, 1907

Immidae
Moca pelinactis (Meyrick, 1925)

Lasiocampidae
Anadiasa pseudometoides Tams, 1929
Beralade bistrigata Strand, 1909
Beralade unistriga Hering, 1928
Bombycopsis indecora (Walker, 1865)
Catalebeda discocellularis Strand, 1912
Catalebeda elegans Aurivillius, 1925
Cheligium choerocampoides (Holland, 1893)
Cheligium licrisonia Zolotuhin & Gurkovich, 2009
Cheligium lineatum (Aurivillius, 1893)
Cheligium nigrescens (Aurivillius, 1909)
Cheligium pinheyi Zolotuhin & Gurkovich, 2009
Chionopsyche admirabile Zolotuhin, 2010
Chrysopsyche mirifica (Butler, 1878)
Chrysopsyche yaundae Bethune-Baker, 1927
Cleopatrina bilinea (Walker, 1855)
Cleopatrina phocea (Druce, 1887)
Epicnapteroides lobata Strand, 1912
Eucraera minor (Gaede, 1915)
Euphorea ondulosa (Conte, 1909)
Filiola dogma Zolotuhin & Gurkovich, 2009
Filiola lanceolata (Hering, 1932)
Filiola occidentale (Strand, 1912)
Gonobombyx angulata Aurivillius, 1893
Gonometa nysa Druce, 1887
Gonometa rufobrunnea Aurivillius, 1922
Gonometa sjostedti Aurivillius, 1892
Gonopacha brotoessa (Holland, 1893)
Grellada imitans (Aurivillius, 1893)
Lechriolepis basirufa Strand, 1912
Lechriolepis nigrivenis Strand, 1912
Lechriolepis tessmanni Strand, 1912
Leipoxais alazon Hering, 1928
Leipoxais batesi Bethune-Baker, 1927
Leipoxais castanea Tams, 1929
Leipoxais dysaresta Hering, 1928
Leipoxais hapsimachus Hering, 1928
Leipoxais miara Hering, 1928
Leipoxais peraffinis Holland, 1893
Leipoxais proboscidea (Guérin-Méneville, 1832)
Leipoxais regularis Strand, 1912
Leipoxais rufobrunnea Strand, 1912
Leipoxais siccifolia Aurivillius, 1902
Mallocampa alenica Strand, 1912
Mallocampa audea (Druce, 1887)
Mallocampa jaensis Bethune-Baker, 1927
Mallocampa punctilimbata Strand, 1912
Mallocampa schultzei Aurivillius
Metajana chanleri Holland, 1896
Mimopacha cinerascens (Holland, 1893)
Mimopacha gerstaeckerii (Dewitz, 1881)
Mimopacha knoblauchii (Dewitz, 1881)
Mimopacha pelodis Hering, 1928
Morongea arnoldi (Aurivillius, 1909)
Morongea avoniffi (Tams, 1929)
Morongea flavipicta (Tams, 1929)
Morongea lampara Zolotuhin & Prozorov, 2010
Muzunguja rectilineata (Aurivillius, 1900)
Nepehria electrophaea (Tams, 1929)
Nepehria olivia Gurkovich & Zolotuhin, 2010
Odontocheilopteryx conzolia Gurkovich & Zolotuhin, 2009
Odontocheilopteryx haribda Gurkovich & Zolotuhin, 2009
Odontocheilopteryx similis Tams, 1929
Odontopacha phaula Tams, 1929
Odontopacha spissa Tams, 1929
Opisthodontia tessmanni Hering, 1928
Oplometa cassandra (Druce, 1887)
Pachymeta contraria (Walker, 1855)
Pachymetana carnegiei (Tams, 1829)
Pachymetana custodita (Strand, 1912)
Pachymetana niveoplaga (Aurivillius, 1900)
Pachymetoides strandi (Tams, 1929)
Pachyna bogema Zolotuhin & Gurkovich, 2009
Pachyna subfascia (Walker, 1855)
Pachytrina crestalina Zolotuhin & Gurkovich, 2009
Pachytrina elygara Zolotuhin & Gurkovich, 2009
Pachytrina honrathii (Dewitz, 1881)
Pachytrina okzilina Zolotuhin & Gurkovich, 2009
Pachytrina philargyria (Hering, 1928)
Pachytrina rubra (Tams, 1929)
Pallastica lateritia (Hering, 1928)
Pallastica mesoleuca (Strand, 1911)
Philotherma sordida Aurivillius, 1905
Philotherma spargata (Holland, 1893)
Pseudolyra divisa Aurivillius, ????
Pseudometa concava (Strand, 1912)
Pseudometa pagetodes Tams, 1929
Pseudometa punctipennis (Strand, 1912)
Pseudometa schultzei Aurivillius, 1905
Pseudometa thysanodicha Tams, 1929
Sonitha bernardii Zolotuhin & Prozorov, 2010
Sonitha libera (Aurivillius, 1914)
Stenophatna hollandi (Tams, 1929)
Stenophatna kahli (Tams, 1929)
Stoermeriana camerunicum (Aurivillius, 1902)
Stoermeriana flavimaculata Tams, 1929
Stoermeriana graberi (Dewitz, 1881)
Stoermeriana ocellata Tams, 1929
Stoermeriana singulare (Aurivillius, 1893)
Stoermeriana sjostedti (Aurivillius, 1902)
Stoermeriana superba (Aurivillius, 1908)
Stoermeriana vinacea Tams, 1929
Streblote nyassanum (Strand, 1912)
Streblote panda Hübner, 1822
Streblote splendens (Druce, 1887)
Streblote vesta (Druce, 1887)
Theophasida obusta (Tams, 1929)
Theophasida superba (Aurivillius, 1914)
Trabala burchardi (Dewitz, 1881)
Trabala charon Druce, 1910

Limacodidae
Andaingo melampepla (Holland, 1893)
Andaingo rufivena (Hering, 1928)
Anilina plebeia (Karsch, 1899)
Apreptophanes stevensoni Janse, 1964
Baria elsa (Druce, 1887)
Birthama dodona Druce, 1910
Brachiopsis conjunctoides Hering, 1933
Casphalia extranea (Walker, 1869)
Chrysopoloma nigrociliata Aurivillius, 1905
Chrysopoloma opalina Druce, 1910
Compactena hilda (Druce, 1887)
Cosuma rugosa Walker, 1855
Ctenolita anacompa Karsch, 1896
Ctenolita argyrobapta Karsch, 1899
Ctenolita chrostisa Karsch, 1896
Delorhachis viridiplaga Karsch, 1896
Hadraphe aprica Karsch, 1899
Latoia cretata (Karsch, 1899)
Latoia urda (Druce, 1887)
Latoia vitilena (Karsch, 1896)
Natada julia Druce, 1887
Natada undina Druce, 1887
Niphadolepis afflicta Hering, 1928
Niphadolepis improba Hering, 1928
Parasa carnapi Karsch, 1899
Parasa trapezoidea Aurivillius, 1900
Parasa viridissima Holland, 1893
Prolatoia sjostedti (Aurivillius, 1897)
Scotinochroa fulgorifera Hering, 1928
Semyrilla lineata (Holland, 1893)
Sporetolepis subpellucens Karsch, 1899
Sporetolepis venusta Hering, 1928
Stroter capillatus Karsch, 1899
Stroter comatus Karsch, 1899
Trachyptena nigromaculata Hering, 1928

Lymantriidae
Abynotha preussi (Mabille & Vuillot, 1892)
Aclonophlebia diffusa Hering, 1926
Aclonophlebia ganymedes Hering, 1926
Argyrostagma niobe (Weymer, 1896)
Aroa discalis Walker, 1855
Aroa yokoae Bethune-Baker, 1927
Barobata trocta Karsch, 1895
Batella muscosa (Holland, 1893)
Conigephyra citrona (Hering, 1926)
Creagra albina (Plötz, 1880)
Creagra liturata (Guérin-Méneville, 1844)
Crorema mentiens Walker, 1855
Dasychira albiapex Hering, 1926
Dasychira albilinea (Holland, 1893)
Dasychira albilunulata (Karsch, 1895)
Dasychira albinotata (Holland, 1893)
Dasychira antica (Walker, 1855)
Dasychira basilinea Hering, 1926
Dasychira bimaculata Aurivillius, 1926
Dasychira brunneicosta (Holland, 1893)
Dasychira caeca (Plötz, 1880)
Dasychira castor Hering, 1926
Dasychira chilophaea Hering, 1926
Dasychira citana (Schaus & Clements, 1893)
Dasychira coeruleifascia (Holland, 1893)
Dasychira delicata (Holland, 1893)
Dasychira deplagiata Hering, 1926
Dasychira endophaea Hampson, 1910
Dasychira gonophora (Holland, 1893)
Dasychira goodii (Holland, 1893)
Dasychira heringiana Bryk, 1935
Dasychira hypocrita Hering, 1926
Dasychira laeliopsis Hering, 1926
Dasychira loxogramma Hering, 1926
Dasychira melanoproctis Hering, 1926
Dasychira multilinea Hering, 1926
Dasychira ocellata (Holland, 1893)
Dasychira ocellifera (Holland, 1893)
Dasychira orphnina Hering, 1926
Dasychira pennatula (Fabricius, 1793)
Dasychira ploetzi Hering, 1926
Dasychira poecila Hering, 1926
Dasychira pollux Hering, 1926
Dasychira proletaria (Holland, 1893)
Dasychira prospera Hering, 1926
Dasychira pulchripes Aurivillius, 1904
Dasychira rhopalum Hering, 1926
Dasychira rubricosta Hering, 1926
Dasychira ruptilinea Holland, 1893
Dasychira saussurii Dewitz, 1881
Dasychira spargata Hering, 1926
Dasychira sphalera Hering, 1926
Dasychira sphaleroides Hering, 1926
Dasychira symbolum Hering, 1926
Dasychira violacea Hering, 1926
Dasychira xylopoecila Hering, 1926
Eudasychira calliprepes (Collenette, 1933)
Euproctilla disjuncta Aurivillius, 1904
Euproctilla insignis Aurivillius, 1904
Euproctilla satyrus Hering, 1926
Euproctilla tesselata (Holland, 1893)
Euproctillina mesomelaena (Holland, 1893)
Euproctillopsis affinis Hering, 1926
Euproctis apicipuncta (Holland, 1893)
Euproctis bigutta Holland, 1893
Euproctis dewitzi (Grünberg, 1907)
Euproctis kamerunica Hering, 1926
Euproctis lyonia Swinhoe, 1904
Euproctis melaleuca (Holland, 1893)
Euproctis mima Strand, 1912
Euproctis molunduana Aurivillius, 1925
Euproctis parallela (Holland, 1893)
Euproctis plagiata (Walker, 1855)
Euproctis pygmaea (Walker, 1855)
Euproctis rivularis Gaede, 1916
Euproctis rubroguttata Aurivillius, 1904
Euproctis sjoestedti Aurivillius, 1904
Euproctis vagans (Hering, 1926)
Grammoa striata Aurivillius, 1904
Heteronygmia flavescens Holland, 1893
Heteronygmia manicata (Aurivillius, 1892)
Kintana ocellatula (Hering, 1926)
Lacipa robusta Hering, 1926
Laelia batoides Plötz, 1880
Laelia bonaberiensis (Strand, 1915)
Laelia danva (Schaus & Clements, 1893)
Laelia diascia Hampson, 1905
Laelia extorta (Distant, 1897)
Laelia fracta Schaus & Clements, 1893
Laelia fusca (Walker, 1855)
Laelia gigantea Hampson, 1910
Laelia mediofasciata (Hering, 1926)
Laelia mesoxantha Hering, 1926
Laelia nubifuga (Holland, 1893)
Laelia pheosia (Hampson, 1910)
Laelia protecta Hering, 1926
Laelia stigmatica (Holland, 1893)
Laelia thanatos (Hering, 1926)
Leucoma parva (Plötz, 1880)
Leucoma purissima (Hering, 1926)
Leucoma xanthocephala (Hering, 1926)
Leucoperina kahli (Holland, 1893)
Liparodonta convexa Hering, 1927
Lomadonta erythrina Holland, 1893
Lomadonta hoesemanni Bryk, 1913
Lomadonta umbrata Bryk, 1913
Lymantria rubroviridis Hering, 1927
Lymantria vacillans Walker, 1855
Marblepsis dolosa Hering, 1926
Marblepsis niveola Hering, 1926
Mylantria xanthospila (Plötz, 1880)
Naroma signifera Walker, 1856
Naroma varipes (Walker, 1865)
Neomardara africana (Holland, 1893)
Olene basalis (Walker, 1855)
Otroeda hesperia (Cramer, 1779)
Otroeda nerina (Drury, 1780)
Otroeda permagnifica Holland, 1893
Paqueta chloroscia (Hering, 1926)
Paramarbla elegantula (Hering, 1926)
Paramarbla indentata (Holland, 1893)
Pirga mirabilis (Aurivillius, 1891)
Pirgula octoguttata Tessmann, 1921
Porthesaroa lacipa Hering, 1926
Porthesaroa noctua Hering, 1926
Pteredoa nigropuncta Hering, 1926
Rahona ladburyi (Bethune-Baker, 1911)
Rahona seitzi (Hering, 1926)
Stracena bananoides (Hering, 1927)
Stracena fuscivena Swinhoe, 1903
Stracena promelaena (Holland, 1893)
Stracena sulphureivena (Aurivillius, 1905)
Stracena tavetensis (Holland, 1892)
Synogdoa simplex Aurivillius, 1904
Tamsita ochthoeba (Hampson, 1920)
Terphothrix lanaria Holland, 1893
Terphothrix tenuis (Holland, 1893)
Usimbara lata (Holland, 1893)
Viridichira cameruna (Aurivillius, 1904)
Viridichirana chlorophila (Hering, 1926)

Metarbelidae
Haberlandia hilaryae Lehmann, 2011
Haberlandia hintzi (Grünberg, 1911)
Kroonia adamauensis Lehmann, 2010
Lebedodes clathratus Grünberg, 1911
Lebedodes fraterna Gaede, 1929
Lebedodes schaeferi Grünberg, 1911
Metarbela bueana Strand, 1912
Metarbela rava Karsch, 1896
Metarbela reticulosana Strand, 1913
Metarbela rufa Gaede, 1929
Metarbela triguttata Aurivillius, 1905
Ortharbela castanea Gaede, 1929
Ortharbela semifasciata Gaede, 1929
Teragra clarior Gaede, 1929

Noctuidae
Achaea catocaloides Guenée, 1852
Achaea cyanobathra L. B. Prout, 1919
Achaea cymatias L. B. Prout, 1919
Achaea leucopera Druce, 1912
Achaea lienardi (Boisduval, 1833)
Achaea poliopasta Hampson, 1913
Achaea rothkirchi (Strand, 1914)
Acontia apatelia (Swinhoe, 1907)
Acontia basifera Walker, 1857
Acontia briola Holland, 1894
Acontia callima Bethune-Baker, 1911
Acontia hemiselenias (Hampson, 1918)
Acontia imitatrix Wallengren, 1856
Acontia insocia (Walker, 1857)
Acontia transfigurata Wallengren, 1856
Acontia wahlbergi Wallengren, 1856
Aegocera fervida (Walker, 1854)
Aegocera obliqua Mabille, 1893
Aegocera tigrina (Druce, 1882)
Agnomonia orontes Plötz, 1880
Amyna axis Guenée, 1852
Amyna rubrirena Hampson, 1918
Andobana multipunctata (Druce, 1899)
Anomis erosa (Hübner, 1818)
Anticarsia rubricans (Boisduval, 1833)
Asota speciosa (Drury, 1773)
Audea melaleuca Walker, 1865
Audea paulumnodosa Kühne, 2005
Bareia incidens Walker, 1858
Bertulania corticea Strand, 1914
Brachyherca saphobasis Hampson, 1926
Busseola convexilimba Strand, 1912
Caligatus angasii Wing, 1850
Carpostalagma viridis (Plötz, 1880)
Caryonopera breviramia Hampson, 1926
Catephia squamosa (Wallengren, 1856)
Chrysodeixis chalcites (Esper, 1789)
Colbusa euclidica Walker, 1865
Conservula alambica Gaede, 1915
Crameria amabilis (Drury, 1773)
Cyligramma amblyops Mabille, 1891
Cyligramma latona (Cramer, 1775)
Cyligramma limacina (Guérin-Méneville, 1832)
Dysgonia adunca (L. B. Prout, 1919)
Dysgonia angularis (Boisduval, 1833)
Dysgonia humilis Holland, 1894
Dysgonia isotima (L. B. Prout, 1919)
Dysgonia pudica (Möschler, 1887)
Egnasia rufifusalis Hampson, 1926
Enmonodiops ochrodiscata Hampson, 1926
Erebus macrops (Linnaeus, 1767)
Eucampima poliostidza Hampson, 1926
Eudocima divitiosa (Walker, 1869)
Eudocima fullonia (Clerck, 1764)
Eudocima materna (Linnaeus, 1767)
Eutelia endoleuca (Hampson, 1918)
Eutornoptera endosticta Hampson, 1926
Facidia vacillans (Walker, 1858)
Feliniopsis africana (Schaus & Clements, 1893)
Feliniopsis confusa (Laporte, 1973)
Feliniopsis connivens (Felder & Rogenhofer, 1874)
Feliniopsis duponti (Laporte, 1974)
Feliniopsis grisea (Laporte, 1973)
Feliniopsis gueneei (Laporte, 1973)
Feliniopsis hosplitoides (Laporte, 1979)
Feliniopsis kobesi Hacker & Fibiger, 2007
Feliniopsis laportei Hacker & Fibiger, 2007
Feliniopsis legraini Hacker & Fibiger, 2007
Feliniopsis ligniensis (Laporte, 1973)
Feliniopsis politzari Hacker & Fibiger, 2007
Feliniopsis satellitis (Berio, 1974)
Focillopis eclipsia Hampson, 1926
Gesonia obeditalis Walker, 1859
Godasa sidae (Fabricius, 1793)
Gracilodes disticha Hampson, 1926
Gracilodes metopis Hampson, 1926
Heliophisma catocalina Holland, 1894
Heliophisma klugii (Boisduval, 1833)
Heraclia aemulatrix (Westwood, 1881)
Heraclia buchholzi (Plötz, 1880)
Heraclia hornimani (Druce, 1880)
Heraclia karschi (Holland, 1897)
Heraclia longipennis (Walker, 1854)
Heraclia medeba (Druce, 1880)
Heraclia nigridorsa (Mabille, 1890)
Heraclia pallida (Walker, 1854)
Heraclia poggei (Dewitz, 1879)
Heraclia zenkeri (Karsch, 1895)
Homodina argentifera Hampson, 1926
Hypocala gaedei Berio, 1955
Hypotuerta transiens (Hampson, 1901)
Lithacodia blandula (Guenée, 1862)
Lobophyllodes miniatus (Grünberg, 1907)
Lophoptera semirufa Druce, 1911
Marcipa accentifera Pelletier, 1975
Marcipa aequatorialis Pelletier, 1975
Marcipa argyrosema Hampson, 1926
Marcipa douala Pelletier, 1975
Marcipa kirdii Pelletier, 1975
Marcipa maculiferoides (Strand, 1914)
Marcipa mariaeclarae Pelletier, 1975
Marcipa viettei Pelletier, 1975
Marcipalina clenchi (Pelletier, 1975)
Marcipalina laportei (Pelletier, 1975)
Marcipalina triangulifera (Holland, 1894)
Marcipalina violacea (Pelletier, 1974)
Masalia cheesmanae Seymour, 1972
Masalia galatheae (Wallengren, 1856)
Massaga hesparia (Cramer, 1775)
Massaga maritona Butler, 1868
Massaga monteirona Butler, 1874
Massaga xenia (Jordan, 1913)
Maxera brachypecten Hampson, 1926
Maxera euryptera Hampson, 1926
Mazuca strigicincta Walker, 1866
Mentaxya albifrons (Geyer, 1837)
Metagarista maenas (Herrich-Schäffer, 1853)
Metagarista triphaenoides Walker, 1854
Misa cosmetica Karsch, 1898
Misa memnonia Karsch, 1895
Mocis frugalis (Fabricius, 1775)
Mocis mayeri (Boisduval, 1833)
Mocis repanda (Fabricius, 1794)
Mocis undata (Fabricius, 1775)
Ochropleura rufulana (Laporte, 1973)
Omphaloceps triangularis (Mabille, 1893)
Ophiusa tettensis (Hopffer, 1857)
Ophiusa violisparsa (L. B. Prout, 1919)
Oruza divisa (Walker, 1862)
Ovios capensis (Herrich-Schäffer, 1854)
Ozarba domina (Holland, 1894)
Ozarba heliastis (Hampson, 1902)
Ozarba heringi Berio, 1940
Pangrapta camerunia Hampson, 1926
Pangrapta eucraspeda Hampson, 1926
Parachalciope benitensis (Holland, 1894)
Paralephana bisignata Hampson, 1926
Paralephana curvilinea Hampson, 1926
Paralephana mesoscia Hampson, 1926
Paralephana monogona Hampson, 1926
Paralephana rectilinea Hampson, 1926
Phaegorista bicurvata Gaede, 1926
Phaegorista rubriventris Aurivillius, 1925
Phaegorista similis Walker, 1869
Phytometra duplicalis (Walker, 1866)
Polydesma umbricola Boisduval, 1833
Sarothroceras banaka (Plötz, 1880)
Scambina roseipicta (Druce, 1911)
Soloe trigutta Walker, 1854
Soloella guttivaga (Walker, 1854)
Tatorinia pallidipennis Hampson, 1926
Tavia polycyma Hampson, 1926
Thiacidas berenice (Fawcett, 1916)
Thiacidas juvenis Hacker & Zilli, 2007
Thiacidas legraini Hacker & Zilli, 2007
Thiacidas mukim (Berio, 1977)
Thiacidas schausi (Hampson, 1905)
Tolna chionopera (Druce, 1912)
Tolna versicolor Walker, 1869
Tracheplexia altitudinis Laporte, 1978
Tracheplexia occidentalis Laporte, 1973
Tracheplexia sylvestris Laporte, 1978
Trigonodes hyppasia (Cramer, 1779)
Trisulopsis clathrata Grünberg, 1907
Tuerta chrysochlora Walker, 1869

Nolidae
Eligma duplicata Aurivillius, 1892
Eligma hypsoides (Walker, 1869)
Goniocalpe leucotrigona Hampson, 1918
Leocyma camilla (Druce, 1887)
Maurilia heterochroa Hampson, 1905
Negeta albiplagiata Hampson, 1918
Negeta mesoleuca (Holland, 1894)
Westermannia monticola Strand, 1913

Notodontidae
Afrocerura cameroona (Bethune-Baker, 1927)
Anaphe panda (Boisduval, 1847)
Anaphe venata Butler, 1878
Andocidia tabernaria Kiriakoff, 1958
Antheua bossumensis (Gaede, 1915)
Antheua rufovittata (Aurivillius, 1901)
Antheua simplex Walker, 1855
Atrasana rectilinea (Gaede, 1928)
Belisaria camerunica Kiriakoff, 1965
Bisolita strigata (Aurivillius, 1906)
Boscawenia latifasciata (Gaede, 1928)
Brachychira davus Kiriakoff, 1965
Brachychira ferruginea Aurivillius, 1905
Catarctia biseriata (Plötz, 1880)
Cerurina marshalli (Hampson, 1910)
Chlorocalliope rivata (Hampson, 1910)
Chlorochadisra viridipulverea (Gaede, 1928)
Clostera vumba Kiriakoff, 1981
Crestonica circulosa (Gaede, 1928)
Daulopaectes trichosa (Hampson, 1910)
Deinarchia apateloides (Holland, 1893)
Desmeocraera albicans Gaede, 1928
Desmeocraera brunneicosta Gaede, 1928
Desmeocraera chloeropsis (Holland, 1893)
Desmeocraera falsa (Holland, 1893)
Desmeocraera ferevaria Kiriakoff, 1958
Desmeocraera glauca Gaede, 1928
Desmeocraera imploratrix Kiriakoff, 1958
Desmeocraera inquisitrix Kiriakoff, 1958
Desmeocraera latex (Druce, 1901)
Desmeocraera latifasciata Gaede, 1928
Desmeocraera leucophaea Gaede, 1928
Desmeocraera leucosticta (Hampson, 1910)
Desmeocraera oleacea Kiriakoff, 1958
Desmeocraera pomaria Kiriakoff, 1958
Desmeocraera postulatrix Kiriakoff, 1958
Desmeocraera reclamatrix Kiriakoff, 1958
Desmeocraera sagittata Gaede, 1928
Desmeocraera sagum Kiriakoff, 1958
Desmeocraera varia (Walker, 1855)
Desmeocraera virescens Kiriakoff, 1958
Desmeocraera weberiana Kiriakoff, 1958
Diodorina insueta Kiriakoff, 1965
Diopeithes cyamina Kiriakoff, 1958
Elaphrodes duplex (Gaede, 1928)
Elaphrodes nephocrossa Bethune-Baker, 1909
Enomotarcha adversa (Karsch, 1895)
Enomotarcha alchornea (Schultze, 1914)
Enomotarcha apicalis (Aurivillius, 1925)
Enomotarcha chloana (Holland, 1893)
Enomotarcha spectabilis Kiriakoff, 1965
Epanaphe clara (Holland, 1893)
Epanaphe distalis Gaede, 1928
Epanaphe fasciata (Aurivillius, 1925)
Epanaphe moloneyi (Druce, 1887)
Epanaphe parva (Aurivillius, 1891)
Epidonta atra (Gaede, 1916)
Epidonta brunneomixta (Mabille, 1897)
Epimetula albipuncta (Gaede, 1928)
Eurystauridia olivacea (Gaede, 1928)
Eurystauridia triangularis (Gaede, 1928)
Eutricholoba signata Kiriakoff, 1965
Hampsonita esmeralda (Hampson, 1910)
Harpandrya aeola Bryk, 1913
Macronadata collaris Möschler, 1887
Macronadata viridis Druce, 1910
Odontoperas aethiops Kiriakoff, 1965
Peratodonta brunnea Aurivillius, 1904
Peratodonta olivacea Gaede, 1928
Phalera atrata (Grünberg, 1907)
Pittheides chloauchena (Holland, 1893)
Pseudobarobata angulata Gaede, 1928
Pseudoscrancia africana (Holland, 1893)
Ptilura argyraspis Holland, 1893
Pycnographa tamarix Kiriakoff, 1958
Rhynchophalera signata Aurivillius, 1904
Scalmicauda argenteomaculata (Aurivillius, 1892)
Scalmicauda bicolorata Gaede, 1928
Scalmicauda eriphyla Kiriakoff, 1979
Scalmicauda fuscinota Aurivillius, 1904
Scalmicauda hoesemanni (Strand, 1911)
Scalmicauda rectilinea (Gaede, 1928)
Scalmicauda tessmanni (Strand, 1911)
Scalmicauda triangulum Kiriakoff, 1959
Scarnica olivina Kiriakoff, 1962
Scrancia africana (Aurivillius, 1904)
Scrancia albidorsa Gaede, 1930
Scrancia albiplaga (Gaede, 1928)
Scrancia leucopera Hampson, 1910
Scrancia modesta Holland, 1893
Scrancia prothoracalis Strand, 1911
Scrancia sagittata Gaede, 1928
Scrancia subrosea Gaede, 1928
Scrancia viridis Gaede, 1928
Sidisca hypochloe Kiriakoff, 1958
Somerina arcuata Kiriakoff, 1965
Someropsis viriditincta Strand, 1912
Stauropussa chloe (Holland, 1893)
Stenostaura impeditus (Walker, 1865)
Stenostaura ophthalmica Kiriakoff, 1968
Synete frugalis Kiriakoff, 1959
Synete picta Kiriakoff, 1959
Tricholoba immodica Strand, 1911
Tricholoba trisignata Strand, 1911
Ulinella corticicolor (Aurivillius, 1904)

Psychidae
Eumeta cervina Druce, 1887

Pterophoridae
Antarches aguessei (Bigot, 1964)
Fletcherella niphadarcha (Meyrick, 1930)
Hellinsia lienigianus (Zeller, 1852)
Marasmarcha sisyrodes Meyrick, 1921
Megalorhipida leucodactylus (Fabricius, 1794)
Pterophorus albidus (Zeller, 1852)
Pterophorus candidalis (Walker, 1864)
Pterophorus lampra (Bigot, 1969)
Pterophorus virgo (Strand, 1913)
Sphenarches anisodactylus (Walker, 1864)
Stenodacma wahlbergi (Zeller, 1852)

Pyralidae
Biafra separatella (Ragonot, 1888)
Endotricha niveifimbrialis Hampson, 1906
Endotricha vinolentalis Ragonot, 1891
Lamoria surrufa Whalley, 1964
Omphalobasella inconspicua Strand, 1915
Paraglossa fumicilialis Hampson, 1916
Paraglossa sanguimarginalis Hampson, 1916
Patna inconspicua (Strand, 1913)
Pyralis manihotalis Guenée, 1854

Saturniidae
Argema fournieri Darge, 1971
Aurivillius arata (Westwood, 1849)
Bunaea alcinoe (Stoll, 1780)
Bunaeopsis clementi Lemaire & Rougeot, 1975
Bunaeopsis hersilia (Westwood, 1849)
Bunaeopsis thyene (Weymer, 1896)
Carnegia mirabilis (Aurivillius, 1895)
Decachorda fulvia (Druce, 1886)
Epiphora albidus (Druce, 1886)
Epiphora bauhiniae (Guérin-Méneville, 1832)
Epiphora boolana Strand, 1909
Epiphora feae Aurivillius, 1910
Epiphora getula (Maassen & Weymer, 1885)
Epiphora magdalena Grünberg, 1909
Epiphora pelosoma Rothschild, 1907
Epiphora perspicuus (Butler, 1878)
Epiphora ploetzi (Weymer, 1880)
Epiphora rectifascia Rothschild, 1907
Epiphora vacuna (Westwood, 1849)
Gonimbrasia pales (Weymer, 1908)
Goodia astrica Darge, 1977
Goodia falcata (Aurivillius, 1893)
Goodia hierax Jordan, 1922
Goodia nodulifera (Karsch, 1892)
Goodia obscuripennis Strand, 1912
Goodia thia Jordan, 1922
Holocerina angulata (Aurivillius, 1893)
Imbrasia epimethea (Drury, 1772)
Imbrasia obscura (Butler, 1878)
Lobobunaea acetes (Westwood, 1849)
Lobobunaea goodi (Holland, 1893)
Lobobunaea jeanneli Rougeot, 1959
Lobobunaea phaedusa (Drury, 1782)
Ludia obscura Aurivillius, 1893
Ludia orinoptena Karsch, 1892
Micragone agathylla (Westwood, 1849)
Micragone camerunensis (Strand, 1909)
Micragone martinae Rougeot, 1952
Micragone mirei Darge, 1990
Micragone nenia (Westwood, 1849)
Nudaurelia alopia Westwood, 1849
Nudaurelia anthina (Karsch, 1892)
Nudaurelia anthinoides Rougeot, 1978
Nudaurelia bamendana Schultze, 1914
Nudaurelia bouvieri (Le Moult, 1933)
Nudaurelia dione (Fabricius, 1793)
Nudaurelia eblis Strecker, 1876
Nudaurelia emini (Butler, 1888)
Nudaurelia jamesoni (Druce, 1890)
Nudaurelia xanthomma (Rothschild, 1907)
Orthogonioptilum adiegetum Karsch, 1892
Orthogonioptilum geniculipennis Strand, 1910
Orthogonioptilum kahli (Holland, 1921)
Orthogonioptilum luminosa (Bouvier, 1930)
Orthogonioptilum monochromum Karsch, 1892
Orthogonioptilum ochraceum Rougeot, 1958
Orthogonioptilum prox Karsch, 1892
Orthogonioptilum rougeoti Darge, 1973
Orthogonioptilum solium Bouyer, 1989
Orthogonioptilum tristis (Sonthonnax, 1898)
Orthogonioptilum vestigiata (Holland, 1893)
Pselaphelia gemmifera (Butler, 1878)
Pseudantheraea discrepans (Butler, 1878)
Pseudaphelia simplex Rebel, 1906
Pseudimbrasia deyrollei (J. Thomson, 1858)
Pseudobunaea alinda (Sonthonnax, 1899)
Pseudobunaea cleopatra (Aurivillius, 1893)
Pseudobunaea illustris Weymer, ????
Pseudobunaea sjoestedti (Aurivillius, 1893)
Pseudobunaea tyrrhena (Westwood, 1849)
Tagoropsis flavinata (Walker, 1865)
Urota herbuloti Darge, 1975
Urota sinope (Westwood, 1849)

Sesiidae
Callisphecia bicincta Le Cerf, 1916
Callisphecia oberthueri Le Cerf, 1916
Camaegeria auripicta Strand, 1914
Conopia iris Le Cerf, 1916
Conopia maculiventris (Le Cerf, 1916)
Conopia pauper Le Cerf, 1916
Conopsia terminiflava Strand, 1913
Episannina chalybea Aurivillius, 1905
Episannina modesta (Le Cerf, 1917)
Homogyna sanguicosta Hampson, 1919
Macrotarsipus africanus (Beutenmüller, 1899)
Megalosphecia gigantipes Le Cerf, 1916
Melittia brevicornis Aurivillius, 1905
Melittia victrix Le Cerf, 1916
Proaegeria vouauxi Le Cerf, 1916
Synanthedon gracilis (Hampson, 1910)
Tipulamima festiva (Beutenmüller, 1899)
Vespaegeria typica Strand, 1913

Sphingidae
Acanthosphinx guessfeldti (Dewitz, 1879)
Acherontia atropos (Linnaeus, 1758)
Agrius convolvuli (Linnaeus, 1758)
Antinephele anomala (Butler, 1882)
Antinephele camerounensis Clark, 1937
Antinephele efulani Clark, 1926
Antinephele lunulata Rothschild & Jordan, 1903
Antinephele marcida Holland, 1893
Avinoffia hollandi (Clark, 1917)
Basiothia aureata (Karsch, 1891)
Centroctena rutherfordi (Druce, 1882)
Cephonodes hylas (Linnaeus, 1771)
Ceridia heuglini (C. Felder & R. Felder, 1874)
Euchloron megaera (Linnaeus, 1758)
Falcatula cymatodes (Rothschild & Jordan, 1912)
Hippotion aporodes Rothschild & Jordan, 1912
Hippotion balsaminae (Walker, 1856)
Hippotion celerio (Linnaeus, 1758)
Hippotion gracilis (Butler, 1875)
Hippotion irregularis (Walker, 1856)
Hypaedalea lobipennis Strand, 1913
Hypaedalea neglecta Carcasson, 1972
Macroglossum trochilus (Hübner, 1823)
Macropoliana natalensis (Butler, 1875)
Neopolyptychus pygarga (Karsch, 1891)
Neopolyptychus serrator (Jordan, 1929)
Nephele accentifera (Palisot de Beauvois, 1821)
Nephele comma Hopffer, 1857
Nephele funebris (Fabricius, 1793)
Nephele maculosa Rothschild & Jordan, 1903
Nephele monostigma Clark, 1925
Nephele peneus (Cramer, 1776)
Phylloxiphia goodii (Holland, 1889)
Phylloxiphia karschi (Rothschild & Jordan, 1903)
Phylloxiphia oberthueri (Rothschild & Jordan, 1903)
Platysphinx constrigilis (Walker, 1869)
Platysphinx vicaria Jordan, 1920
Polyptychoides digitatus (Karsch, 1891)
Polyptychus affinis Rothschild & Jordan, 1903
Polyptychus bernardii Rougeot, 1966
Polyptychus carteri (Butler, 1882)
Polyptychus enodia (Holland, 1889)
Polyptychus murinus Rothschild, 1904
Polyptychus nigriplaga Rothschild & Jordan, 1903
Polyptychus paupercula (Holland, 1889)
Polyptychus retusus Rothschild & Jordan, 1908
Polyptychus thihongae Bernardi, 1970
Pseudoclanis occidentalis Rothschild & Jordan, 1903
Pseudoclanis rhadamistus (Fabricius, 1781)
Rhadinopasa hornimani (Druce, 1880)
Rufoclanis rosea (Druce, 1882)
Temnora albilinea Rothschild, 1904
Temnora angulosa Rothschild & Jordan, 1906
Temnora avinoffi Clark, 1919
Temnora camerounensis Clark, 1923
Temnora crenulata (Holland, 1893)
Temnora elisabethae Hering, 1930
Temnora griseata Rothschild & Jordan, 1903
Temnora hollandi Clark, 1920
Temnora livida (Holland, 1889)
Temnora nephele Clark, 1922
Temnora ntombi Darge, 1975
Temnora zantus (Herrich-Schäffer, 1854)
Theretra jugurtha (Boisduval, 1875)
Theretra orpheus (Herrich-Schäffer, 1854)
Theretra tessmanni Gehlen, 1927
Xanthopan morganii (Walker, 1856)

Thyrididae
Arniocera cyanoxantha (Mabille, 1893)
Arniocera viridifasciata (Aurivillius, 1900)
Byblisia setipes (Plötz, 1880)
Cornuterus paratrivius Whalley, 1971
Dysodia collinsi Whalley, 1968
Dysodia vitrina (Boisduval, 1829)
Dysodia zelleri (Dewitz, 1881)
Epaena pellucida Whalley, 1971
Epaena trijuncta (Warren, 1898)
Kuja catenula (Pagenstecher, 1892)
Kuja effrenata Whalley, 1971
Lamprochrysa scintillans (Butler, 1893)
Lamprochrysa triplex (Plötz, 1880)
Marmax biincisa (Strand, 1914)
Marmax hyparchus (Cramer, 1779)
Marmax semiaurata (Walker, 1854)
Ninia plumipes (Drury, 1782)
Toosa batesi Bethune-Baker, 1927
Trichobaptes auristrigata (Plötz, 1880)

Tineidae
Cataxipha euxantha Gozmány, 1965
Cimitra fetialis (Meyrick, 1917)
Hapsifera septica Meyrick, 1908
Monopis coniodina Meyrick, 1931
Monopis hypopiasta Meyrick, 1931
Organodesma arsiptila (Meyrick, 1931)
Organodesma petaloxantha (Meyrick, 1931)
Perissomastix gibi Gozmány, 1965

Tortricidae
Accra erythrocyma (Meyrick, 1930)
Accra venatrix (Meyrick, 1930)
Acleris cameroonana Razowski, 2012
Anaccra camerunica (Razowski, 1966)
Anaccra limitana (Razowski, 1966)
Apotoforma fustigera Razowski, 1986
Basigonia anisoscia Diakonoff, 1983
Camadeniana capitalis Strand, 1915
Choristoneura africana Razowski, 2002
Cydia spumans (Meyrick, 1930)
Eccopsis wahlbergiana Zeller, 1852
Idiothauma africanum Walsingham, 1897
Lumaria afrotropica Razowski, 2002
Metendothenia spumans (Meyrick, 1930)
Mictocommosis argus (Walsingham, 1897)
Neorrhyncha camerunica Aarvik, 2004
Olethreutes bryoscopa (Meyrick, 1928)
Olethreutes thermopetra (Meyrick, 1930)
Phalarocarpa ioxanthas (Meyrick, 1930)
Procrica camerunica Razowski, 2002
Procrica ochrata Razowski, 2002
Protancylis bisecta Razowski, 2002
Sycacantha platymolybdis (Meyrick, 1930)

Uraniidae
Aploschema albaria (Plötz, 1880)
Dissoprumna erycinaria (Guenée, 1857)

Xyloryctidae
Ommatothelxis grandis Druce, 1912

Zygaenidae
Astyloneura esmeralda (Hampson, 1920)
Chalconycles anhyalea Hampson, 1920
Saliunca flavifrons (Plötz, 1880)
Saliunca solora (Plötz, 1880)
Saliunca styx (Fabricius, 1775)
Saliunca triguttata Aurivillius, 1925
Saliunca ventralis Jordan, 1907
Syringura triplex (Plötz, 1880)
Tasema nox Holland, 1898

References

External links

Moths
Moths
Cameroon
Cameroon